The Women's Draughts European Championship is the championship in international draughts, since 2000 organised among women by the European Draughts Confederation. Since 2008 championship on Blitz and from 2012 on Rapid, both annually.

Classics

Rapid

Blitz

Superblitz

See also
List of Draughts European Championship winners

References

External links
European Draughts Confederation

Draughts competitions